Larry Towell (born 1953) is a Canadian photographer, poet, and oral historian. Towell is known for his photographs of sites of political conflict in the Ukraine, Nicaragua, El Salvador, Standing Rock and Afghanistan, among others. In 1988, Towell became the first Canadian member of Magnum Photos.

Early life and education
Towell was born in Chatham-Kent, Ontario and grew up in a large family in rural Ontario, attending local schools. At college, he studied visual arts at York University in Toronto, where his interest in photography first began.

Life and work
In 1976 Towell volunteered to work in Calcutta, India, where he became interested in questions about the distribution of wealth and issues of land and landlessness. Returning to Canada, he taught folk music and wrote poetry during the 1980s.

Towell became a freelance photographer in 1984. His early work included projects on the Contra war in Nicaragua, the civil war in El Salvador, relatives of the disappeared in Guatemala, and American Vietnam War veterans who worked to rebuild Vietnam. In 1988, Towell joined the Magnum Photos agency, becoming the first Canadian associated with the group. His first magazine essay looked at the ecological damages from the Exxon Valdez oil spill. He has since had picture essays published in The New York Times, Life, Rolling Stone, and other magazines. His work has included documentation of the Palestinian-Israeli conflict, Mennonite migrant workers in Mexico, and a personal project on his family's farm in southern Ontario. From 2008 to 2011, Towell traveled five times to Afghanistan to photograph the social effects of the Afghan civil war. Between 2013 and 2015, he photographed the above and underground construction work in Toronto's Union Station. In 2015 his photo Isaac's first swim was published by Canada Post as a stamp. In 2016 Towell photographed the Standing Rock protest in Standing Rock, North Dakota.

He works in both film and digital photography formats. He has said "Black and white is still the poetic form of photography. Digital is for the moment; black and white is an investment of time and love." He has also worked with panoramic cameras to document the impact of natural disasters such as Hurricane Katrina.

Towell has published books of photographs, poetry, and oral history. He has also recorded several audio CDs of original poetry and songs.

Personal life
Towell lives in rural Lambton County Ontario and sharecrops a 75-acre farm with his wife Ann and their four children.

Publications
 Burning Cadillacs (1983)
 Gifts of War (1988)
 Somoza's Last Stand (1990)
 The Prison Poems of Ho Chi Minh (1992)
 House on Ninth Street (1994)
 El Salvador (1997)
 Then Palestine (1999)
 The Mennonites (2000)
Second edition. London: Gost, 2022. . Re-edited, re-sequenced and with 40 new images.
 No Man's Land (2005)
 In the Wake of Katrina (2006)
 The World From My Front Porch (2008)
 
 Ruins: Afghanistan (2009)

Films
Indecisive Moments: Video Diary of a Still Photographer (2007) – 40 minute video diary made in the Israeli-occupied territories.

Awards 
1991: Silver Medal, Canadian National Awards
1991: Grant of $2500 from the W. Eugene Smith Memorial Fund to make work about the Nahuas in El Salvador
1991/93: Gold Medal, Western Canada Magazine Awards
1993: 1st Prize, Daily Life Stories category, World Press Photo
1994: Winner, World Press Photo of the Year and General News Stories category
1994: 1st Prize, World Press Photo, Daily Life Stories category
1994: Picture of the Year, Canon Photo Essay Award
1994/95: Gold Medal, Canadian National Awards
1995: Photographers' work grant, The Ernst Haas Awards, Maine Photographic Workshops
1996: El Mundo Award
1996: Oskar Barnack Award
1997: Golden Light (Best Monograph Award)
1998: Society of Publication Designers, Merit Award, The New York Times Magazine
1998: Society of Publication Designers, Magazine of the Year, The New York Times
1998: Overseas Press Club, New York, Citation of Excellence
1998: Pictoral Prize, Pictures of the Year Foundation, University of Missouri
1998: 1st Prize, Portraiture Essay category, Alfred Eisenstaedt Awards for Magazine Photography, Columbia University Graduate School of Journalism
1999: Picture Of the Year (Best Use of Photography in Books)
1999: Roloff Beny Book Award
1999: Grant from the Hasselblad Foundation, Gothenburg, Sweden
2000: Society for News Design Award, La Nacion
2003: Henri Cartier-Bresson Foundation Award
2005: Prix Nadar, for the book No Man's Land
2007: Finalist, Alicia Patterson Award, USA
2007: Achievement In Filmmaking Award, New York International Independent Film and Video Festival
2009: Shortlisted, And/or Photography Book Award, Kraszna-Krausz Foundation, UK for The World From My Front Porch
2011: The Paul de Hueck and Norman Walford Career Achievement Award, Ontario Arts Foundation

Exhibitions 
 1991: Le Mois de la Photo - Maison de la Culture Plateau, Montreal, Quebec, Canada
 1994: Carnets de Voyage - Canadian Museum of Contemporary Photography, Ottawa, Ontario, Canada
 1994: Retrospective - Nieuwekerk, the Netherlands
 1997: Circulo de Bellas Artes, Madrid, Spain
 1997: Noorderlicht Photo Festival, Groningen, Netherlands
 2001: Canadian Museum of Contemporary Photography, Ottawa, Ontario, Canada
 2001: Scottish National Portrait Gallery, Edinburgh, UK
 2005: No Man's Land - Fondation Henri Cartier-Bresson, Paris
 2006: FOAM, Amsterdam, Netherlands
 2008: George Eastman House, Rochester, New York
 2012: Royal Ontario Museum, Toronto, Ontario, Canada

References

External links
Towell's page at Magnum Photos
Focus on Lune Froide : Larry Towell

1953 births
Living people
Canadian photographers
Magnum photographers
Photography in Afghanistan